Klaus Eberhard (born 4 April 1956) is an Austrian former alpine skier who competed in the 1976 Winter Olympics.

External links
 sports-reference.com

1956 births
Living people
Austrian male alpine skiers
Olympic alpine skiers of Austria

Alpine skiers at the 1976 Winter Olympics
Place of birth missing (living people)